The World Group Play-offs were the qualifiers for the highest level of competition in the 2001 Fed Cup and the 2002 Fed Cup.

First round
The first round involved the winners of Zonal Competition from last year (Argentina, Hungary, Japan) being randomly drawn against five teams from the 2000 World Group pools; with the winners were guaranteed a spot in the World Group next year.

Italy vs. Croatia

Japan vs. Argentina

Slovakia vs. Hungary

Australia vs. Austria

Second round
The winners of the first round played off against four other teams from the 2000 World Group pools in the top section, with the winners proceeding to the World Group. The losers of the first round played off against this year's zonal competition winners in the bottom section, with the winners remaining in World Group for next year, and the losers proceeding to Zonal Competition for next year.

Top Section

Italy vs. France

Argentina vs. Germany

Slovakia vs. Russia

Australia vs. Switzerland

Bottom Section

Croatia vs. Venezuela

Japan vs. Sweden

Hungary vs. Israel

Austria vs. Indonesia

References

See also
Fed Cup structure

World Group Play-offs
2001 Fed Cup World Group